Old King Cole is a 1933 Disney cartoon in the Silly Symphonies series, based on several nursery rhymes and fairy tales, including Old King Cole. It was directed by David Hand and released on July 29, 1933.

It's a semi-remake of the 1931 Silly Symphony short Mother Goose Melodies, but in color, with more details and technically advanced animation.

Plot
One evening in Storyland, the story book “Old King Cole” opens itself, and the king's castle folds open. Other nursery rhyme books do the same thing, and several famous characters leave their homes and go to Old King Cole's party. There, all the characters have a small sing-and-dance act. When the Ten Little Indians get on  stage, their dance is so catchy that Old King Cole and all the other characters join in as well. After Old Mother Hubbard accidentally pushes Old King Cole into a fountain, the mice from “Hickory Dickory Dock” tell everybody that it is midnight and that everybody should go home. All the characters return to their books, and Old King Cole sings a farewell song to everybody. Then he puts out a bottle of milk for the milkman before he runs back inside, and the cartoon ends.

Characters portrayed
The cartoon featured popular Nursery Rhyme and Fairy Tale characters. Depicted in the cartoon in chronological order are:
 Old King Cole
 Pied Piper of Hamelin
 Little Boy Blue
 A literally crooked man (There Was A Crooked Man)
 Old Mother Hubbard
 The Old Woman Who Lived in a Shoe
 Mary and her lamb (Mary Had A Little Lamb)
 Little Bo Peep and her sheep
 Little Red Riding Hood and the Big Bad Wolf
 Goldilocks and the Three Bears
 A cat playing the fiddle (Hey Diddle Diddle)
 Queen of Hearts
 Mary and her garden (Mary, Mary, Quite Contrary)
 Peter Peter Pumpkin Eater
 Jack Sprat
 Goosey Gander
 Humpty Dumpty
 The spider from Little Miss Muffet
 Simple Simon
 Three Little Kittens
 Three Blind Mice
 Ten Little Indians
 The butcher, baker, and candlestick maker from Rub-a-dub-dub, all dancing together in their washtub
 The mice from Hickory Dickory Dock.

Composers' Credits (Lyrics and Music) 
 KING COLE'S PARTY (Opening Song), Bert Lewis
 PIPER MAN, Frank Churchill
 LITTLE BOY BLUE, Frank Churchill
 CROOKED MAN, Frank Churchill
 KING COLE'S WELCOME SONG, Bert Lewis
 MARY, MARY QUITE CONTRARY, Frank Churchill
 SIMPLE SIMON, Frank Churchill
 THREE LITTLE KITTENS, Bert Lewis
 THREE BLIND MICE and TEN LITTLE INDIANS, Bert Lewis and Frank Churchill
 HICKORY DICKORY DOCK, Bert Lewis
 KING COLE'S GOOD-NIGHT SONG, Bert Lewis and Frank Churchill
 THE STORY BOOK CLOSES, Bert Lewis

Voice cast
 King Cole: Allan Watson
 Girl trio: The Rhythmettes (including Mary Moder, Beatrice Hagen, and Dorothy Compton)
 Additional voices: Marcellite Garner And Mildred Dixon

Influence
"Old King Cole" is similar in plot and style to the black and white Silly Symphony "Mother Goose Melodies". Various cartoons have made use of a storyline in which story books come to life and the protagonists of the stories interact with each other, including Mother Goose Goes Hollywood (1938) and The Truth About Mother Goose (1957) by Disney Studios themselves, the Betty Boop cartoon Mother Goose Land (1933) by Fleischer Studios, and the Looney Tunes shorts Have You Got Any Castles? (1938), A Gander at Mother Goose (1940), A Coy Decoy (1941) and Book Revue (1946).

Home media
The short was released on December 19, 2006 on Walt Disney Treasures: More Silly Symphonies, Volume Two.

References

More information
 
 Bert Lewis on IMDB
 
 Disney Shorts Information

1933 films
1933 short films
1930s Disney animated short films
1930s color films
Silly Symphonies
1933 animated films
Films directed by David Hand
Films produced by Walt Disney
Films based on nursery rhymes
Films about royalty
Films based on fairy tales
Disney film remakes
Short film remakes
American black-and-white films
Works based on nursery rhymes
1930s American films